John Dovi (born 2 January 1973 in Saint-Maurice, Val-de-Marne, France) is a former French amateur boxer who medaled repeatedly in international competitions.

Career
He was 7 times French light-heavy champ from 1999 to 2005.
In Houston at the 1999 World Amateur Boxing Championships he controversially lost the final to Michael Simms.

In Sydney 2000 he beat Shawn Terry Cox but lost to eventual winner Alexander Lebziak 11:13.

2001 he won the bronze medal at Belfast defeating Artak Malumyan (ARM) 12-8, and Ireland's Alan Reynolds but losing to favorite southpaw Evgeny Makarenko 10:25.

References
National coach from 2007, he is French Olympics Team Head Coach since 2013.
 sports-reference

1973 births
Living people
People from Saint-Maurice, Val-de-Marne
Sportspeople from Val-de-Marne
Light-heavyweight boxers
Boxers at the 2000 Summer Olympics
Olympic boxers of France
French male boxers
AIBA World Boxing Championships medalists